This list gives an overview of the Locomotives and railbuses of the Imperial Royal Austrian State Railways (German: kaiserlich-königliche österreichische Staatsbahnen) or kkStB.

Steam locomotives

Express and passenger train locomotives

Goods locomotives

Light Locomotives

Narrow gauge locomotives

Steam railbuses

Tenders

Water wagons

Electric locomotives

Electric railbuses

Combustion-engined railbuses

Sources 
 Verzeichnis der Lokomotiven, Tender, Wasserwagen und Triebwagen der k.k. österreichischen State Railwayen und der vom Staate betriebenen Privatbahnen after dem Stande vom 30. Juni 1914, Wien, Verlag der k.k. Österreichischen State Railwayen
 Verzeichnis der Lokomotiven, Tender, Wasserwagen und Triebwagen der k.k. österreichischen State Railwayen und der vom Staate betriebenen Privatbahnen after dem Stande vom 30. Juni 1917, Wien, Verlag der k.k. Österreichischen State Railwayen
 Dampfbetrieb in Alt-Österreich 1837-1918, Verlag Slezak, Wien, 1979, 
 

!
Imperial Royal Austrian State Railways
Austria
Austrian railway-related lists